James Cardwell (born Albert Paine Cardwell; November 21, 1921 – January 31, 1954) was an American actor who appeared in more than 20 Hollywood films in the 1940s.

Career
Cardwell is probably best known for his debut as George Sullivan in 1944's Oscar-nominated The Fighting Sullivans, based on the true story of five navy brothers who died in action together when their ship was torpedoed in the Pacific Theater during World War II. His other significant roles included the Benny Goodman musical Sweet and Low-Down (1944), the World War II drama A Walk in the Sun (1945), and the police drama He Walked by Night (1948). Reviewing the 1945 Charlie Chan mystery The Shanghai Cobra, the Kentucky New Era remarked that "James Cardwell, a newcomer to the screen, shows himself to be a fine actor as the romantic lead opposite beautiful Joan Barclay." However, he found himself consigned to B-movies; 1949's Daughter of the Jungle, in which Cardwell played the male lead opposite Lois Hall, earned the dubious distinction of a listing in the 1978 book The Fifty Worst Films of All Time.

In 1950, Cardwell toured Australia with comedian Joe E. Brown in a production of the play Harvey. He then joined the Colleano Troupe, a variety act, with whom he toured Australia, the UK, and the U.S. After returning to the U.S., he made two guest appearances in the Rod Cameron television series City Detective. However, his movie career had stalled. He made only one additional appearance before his death: a small unbilled role in the 1954 monster film Them!

Personal life
Cardwell was born Albert Paine Cardwell in Camden, New Jersey, the son of Raymond Cardwell and Bessie McCarroll. He graduated from Woodrow Wilson High School in 1940.

In 1942, he married Esther Borton. They divorced two years later. In 1951, he became engaged to Australian model June Crocker, but she ended their relationship after she suffered serious burns in a stage accident. According to author Jeffery P. Dennis, Cardwell subsequently "came out" as gay.

Death
Apparently disheartened by his faltering career and financial difficulties, Cardwell fatally shot himself  at the age of 32 in Los Angeles, California on January 31, 1954.

Filmography

 The Fighting Sullivans (1944) as George Thomas Sullivan
 Sweet and Low-Down (1944) as Johnny Birch
 The Shanghai Cobra (1945) as Ned Stewart
 Voice of the Whistler (1945) as Fred Graham
 A Walk in the Sun  (1945) as Sergeant Hoskins
 Fear (1946) as  Ben
 Behind the Mask (1946) as Jeff Mann
 Canyon Passage (1946) as Gray Bartlett
 The Missing Lady (1946) as Terry Blake
 The Devil on Wheels (1947) as Jeff Clark
 It Happened on Fifth Avenue (1947) as Young man in barracks (uncredited)
 Robin Hood of Texas (1947) as Duke Mantel
 The Return of the Whistler (1948) as Charlie Barkley
 King of the Gamblers (1948) as 'Speed' Lacey
 Daredevils of the Clouds (1948) as Johnny Martin
 Harpoon (1948) as Red Dorsett Jr.
 Parole, Inc. (1948) as Duke Vigili
 He Walked by Night (1948) as Chuck Jones
 Trouble Preferred (1948) as Hal 'Tuffy' Tucker
 Daughter of the Jungle (1949) as Paul Cooper
 Down Dakota Way (1949) as Saunders
 San Antone Ambush (1949) as Clint Wheeler
 Tokyo Joe (1949) as Military Police Captain (uncredited)
 And Baby Makes Three (1949) as Police officer (uncredited)
 The Arizona Cowboy (1949) as Hugh Davenport
 Them! (1954) as Officer (uncredited) (final film role)

Notes

References

External links 
  
 

1921 births
1954 deaths
20th-century American male actors
American male film actors
Male actors from New Jersey
Actors from Camden, New Jersey
Suicides by firearm in California
Woodrow Wilson High School (New Jersey) alumni
1954 suicides
American gay actors
LGBT people from New Jersey